The Office of the Education Ombuds, formerly the Office of the Education Ombudsman is a state agency in the Governor’s Office of the U.S. state of Washington. It is separate from the public education system. The office, a traditional government ombudsman position, handles complaints, disputes, and problems between families and K-12 schools "in all areas that affect student learning." The office also makes recommendations to the Governor and legislators for the improvement of public education.

The office addresses bullying.

See also 

 Education in Washington (state)

References

External links 
 Office of the Education Ombuds website

Ombudsman posts
Education in Washington (state)
Education Ombuds